Paulami Sengupta (1969 – 17 October 2018) was an Indian poet and the executive editor of Bengali magazines under ABP House in India; including Desh, Sananda, a magazine for grown ups, Anandamela, Unish Kuri and Anandalok.

Career
Sengupta was born in Jamalpur in Bihar. Thereafter she came to Malda district. Sengupta studied in Alipore Multipurpose Girls High School, and entered in St. Xavier's College, Kolkata and Jadavpur University. She translated several literary works from English and Hindi to Bengali language. His first book of poems Pencil Khuki was published in 1997. She joined as trainee journalist in daily newspaper The Telegraph in 1994. In 2001 she became the chief sub-editor of Anandamela magazine. She also translated Asterix comics series from French to Bengali.

Death
Sengupta died on 17 October 2018 in Kolkata. Paulami Sengupta Memorial Foundation is an initiative taken by her family members.

Literary works
 Amra Aaaj Roomal Chor
 Anandamela Golpo Sankalan (Edited)
 Asterix Comics (Bengali version) (Translator)
 Pencil Khuki
 Pujabarshiki Anandamela Golpo Sankalan (Edited)
 Samanami, Translation of Jhumpa Lahiri's novel The Namesake.
 Ulki
 Muthor Map Upche Jeno Pore

References

2018 deaths
Indian magazine editors
ABP Group
Jadavpur University alumni
St. Xavier's College, Kolkata alumni
People from Malda district
Indian editors
Journalists from West Bengal
1969 births